The Exchange Ilford is the main retail shopping mall of Ilford, east London. It was owned by The Mall Fund for a period of time but has been sold and changed its name to Exchange Ilford in late 2010 or early 2011. The Exchange is located on Ilford High Road in the town centre and opened on 6 September 1991.

Stores
The Exchange's anchor stores are H&M, Marks & Spencer, TK Maxx and Wilko  (the latter of which occupies a former Woolworths store).

Other major stores within Exchange Ilford include Next, WH Smith, New Look, Sports Direct, Burger King, Ryman, Poundland, Peacocks, The Body Shop, and GAME. More stores are located just outside the Exchange, including an Argos, Waterstones and the recently opened Primark.

Structure
It trades from three levels of retail, though its architectural design layout has resulted in the lower floor of retail being separated into two parts, meaning customers wishing to access both parts of the lower level have to travel between the sections via the middle level. There is also an upper level of retail and food court facilities accessed from the middle level. Transit between levels is via a series of lifts, stairs and escalators within the Mall; in addition, some stores trade from two or more levels of the mall.

The design and layout of some of the stores is notable: the Marks & Spencer store is bisected by the Mall site: at ground level it is accessible from the High Road by its external doors either side of the Mall entrance, whilst on the middle level of the mall it is accessible from two entrances facing opposite each other (as in  Broadway Bexleyheath). One of the two sides of M&S is also publicly accessible from the Upper level of the Mall. However, one side closed in July 2015. TK Maxx was initially two separate stores facing each other on opposite sides of the Mall, but this has more recently been changed, with the extension of TK Maxx across the mall area to create a single unified store, in effect splitting the lower mall into three segments, with a third section around the Cranbrook Road entrance (by Wilko) which is now separated from the other main part of the lower mall by TK Maxx.

Past architectural features of the mall are a now gone granite floating sphere and a wishing fountain.

Ownership
In 2012, it was reported that the centre is owned by the London-based Dutch privately held real estate investment company Meyer Bergman. Capital & Regional have owned it since 2017.

Access
Exchange Ilford is in the town centre of Ilford and is accessible by car, with access to parking via Havelock Street and Ley Street. The centre is also served by the numerous Transport for London bus services which serve central Ilford.

References 

Shopping centres in the London Borough of Redbridge
Ilford